Rich Uncle Pennybags is the mascot of the board game of Monopoly. He is depicted as a portly old man with a moustache who wears a morning suit with a bowtie and top hat. In large parts of the world he is known, additionally or exclusively, as the Monopoly Man, or Mr. Monopoly. He also appears in the related games Advance to Boardwalk, Free Parking, Don't Go to Jail, Monopoly City, Monopoly Junior, and Monopoly Deal.

The character first appeared on Chance and Community Chest cards in U.S. editions of Monopoly in 1936. The identity of the character's designer, artist Daniel Fox, was unknown until 2013, when a former Parker Brothers executive, Philip Orbanes, was contacted by one of Fox's grandchildren.

History
The unnamed character made his first appearance outside Monopoly in the Parker Brothers' game Dig, released in 1940. He did not receive a name until 1946, when Parker Brothers produced the game Rich Uncle, where his likeness appeared on the box lid, instructions, and currency.  According to Orbanes, Rich Uncle Pennybags of the American version of Monopoly is modeled after American Progressive Era businessman J. P. Morgan.

Between 1985 and 2008, the character appeared in the second "O" in the word Monopoly as part of the game's logo. More recently, he is depicted over the word "Monopoly", drawn in a 3-D style, extending his right hand. However, he no longer appears uniformly on every Monopoly game box.

In 1988, Orbanes published the first edition of his book The Monopoly Companion. In the book, all of the characters that appear on the Monopoly board or within the decks of cards received a name. Uncle Pennybags' full name was given as Milburn Pennybags, the character "In Jail" is named "Jake, the Jailbird", and the police officer on Go to Jail is named "Officer Mallory".

In 1999, Rich Uncle Pennybags was renamed Mr. Monopoly. That year, a Monopoly Jr. CD-ROM game was released in cereal boxes as part of a General Mills promotion. It introduced Mr. Monopoly's niece and nephew, Sandy and Andy.

According to the book, Monopoly: The World's Most Famous Game & How It Got That Way and The Monopoly Companion, Mr. Monopoly has a second nephew named Randy, although the Monopoly Companion mistakenly refers to Sandy as a boy. Monopoly: The World's Most Famous Game & How It Got That Way also states that Mr. Monopoly has a wife named Madge. He is named as the sixth richest fictional character in the 2006 Forbes Fictional 15 list on its website and the ninth richest in 2011.

Legacy
In 2017, a staff member of the activist group Public Citizen that dressed as Mr. Monopoly (with added monocle) gained Internet and media attention by photobombing the CEO of Equifax during a US Senate hearing relating to that credit bureau's data security breach from earlier that same year.
It was an attempt to bring attention to the use of "forced arbitration" to circumvent consumers' rights to sue financial companies in court.

While Google CEO Sundar Pichai testified before Congress on December 11, 2018, a person costumed in a white mustache and black bowler hat as the Monopoly Man was among those seated behind him.

Clue: Candlestick, a mystery comic book by Dash Shaw based on the board game Clue, features Rich Uncle Pennybags in a cameo. He is referred to as "Milburn."

Vault Boy, the mascot of the Fallout video game series, is based partly on Rich Uncle Pennybags.

A common instance of the Mandela effect is a false memory of Mr. Monopoly as wearing a monocle, which he never has (although a monocle is sometimes used with other characters as visual idiom of to denote an upper-class toff, e.g. Mr. Peanut).

Voices

In licensed media, primarily including advertisements and video games, Mr. Monopoly has been voiced by several voice actors including Tony Waldman, Tony Pope, Wendell Johnson, Dean Hagopian, Mark Dodson, Larry Moran, Michael Cornacchia, Harry Aspinwall, and Rowell Gormon.

References
Specific

General

External links
 
 
 

Mascots introduced in 1936
Toy mascots
Male characters in advertising
Monopoly (game)